The band-winged nightjar or greater band-winged nightjar (Systellura longirostris) is a species of nightjar in the family Caprimulgidae. It is widespread in South America, where it is found in the Andes, Venezuelan Coastal Range, Santa Marta Mountains, Tepuis, most of Chile, Argentina, Paraguay, Uruguay and eastern Brazil. It occurs in a wide range of habitats, from the edge of humid montane forest to shrubby semi-deserts and urban rooftops.

Taxonomy and systematics
According to one morphological characterization there could be two groupings of subspecies distributed in different regions. The first grouping would be characterized as having a greyish-brown color (lowland regions in middle, east and south of range) and the other subspecies grouping has a blackish-brown coloration (north and west in uplands). All individuals in each group are presumed to vary in coloration and are sexually dimorphic.

Subspecies
Eight subspecies have been recognized, including two new subspecies, one from Chile and another from Brazil which have been described within the last few years. Tschudi's nightjar was formerly also considered a subspecies, but has now been elevated to species rank. Recently, it has been suggested that both S. l. roraimae and S. l. ruficervix should be treated as separate species.
 S. l. ruficervix (Sclater, 1866) - Colombia, Venezuela and Ecuador
 S. l. roraimae Chapman, 1929 - tepuis of southern Venezuela
 S. l. atripunctata Chapman, 1923 - Peru to northwestern Argentina
 S. l. bifasciata (Gould, 1837) - Chile, western Argentina
 S. l. pedrolimai (Grantsau, 2008) - northeastern Brazil
 S. l. longirostris (Bonaparte, 1825) - southeastern Brazil, Paraguay, Uruguay and northeastern Argentina
 S. l. mochaensis (Cleere, 2006) - central Chile
 S. l. patagonica (Olrog, 1962) - central and southern Argentina

Description
Over its large range, there are significant variations in its morphology, but, as suggested by its common name, it always has a distinctive band in the wing (best visible in flight), which is white in the male, buff in the female.

This nightjar has a length that varies from 20–27 cm (for Ecuador, 21.5 to 23 cm). The iris, bill, legs and feet vary from a brown to a blackish brown. At the upper side a greyish-brown, blackish-brown, brownish-orange, pale yellowish-brown and greyish-white coloration can be distinguished. The rear of the neck is from a brownish orange to a yellowish brown. Wing-coverts acquire a greyish-brown coloration accompanied with dense spotted yellowish to greyish brown. Scapulars are blackish brown. In males sometimes white and in females sometimes a yellowish-brown mark around the lower throat. 
Belly and flanks become brown or yellowish brown. When flight sights, male has a white marks at the edge of the first four primaries, as well with a white band on the first and fourth rectrices. The female does not possess the white mark on the tail.

The face of the male can be greyish brown with brown marks; crown and margins of the forehead are greyish white. A yellowish-brown to brownish-orange collar is formed at the edges of the neck. Dorsal side has dark greyish-brown coloration with some blackish-brown spots. Alula and the edges of the wing-coverts are white. Background of wing-coverts is predominantly brown, spotted yellowish brown with brown spots. Scapulars are blackish brown, with yellowish-brown dots and brown spots. The Primaries 7th-10th and the secondary feathers are brown with a midway white streak; the contour of P6-P1 is yellowish brown by the edges and brownish orange with small brown marks. Tertiaries feathers are greyish brown with brown dots. Tail is mainly brown; with white marks at the third and fifth rectrices with brownish orange and yellowish brown as contour, usually a 10mm white band is marked across half of the midd-upper innerweb, with white dots with yellowish brown at the outer edge over the band in third and second rectrices. Chin and upper throat yellowish brown, prominent white band at the bottom of the throat. Breast, belly, flanks and ventral coverts vary from greyish brown or brown to a yellowish brown.

Unlike males, females have a yellowish-brown throat; across the 7th-10th primaries a brownish orange to yellowish brown in denoted and tail lacks white marks. Juveniles and immatures are similar to the adults but less specked, with a small brownish orange band narrow at the primary feathers.

Fledglings are born with cryptic plumules that help them blend in with the surrounding ground material to avoid predation. It takes approximately eight days for the coloration of this plumage to start to resembling that of the adults. They hatch with their eyes partially opened and stay motionless during the first day. The first flights or short glides begin after the 12th day under the vigilance of an adult (it is not specified if the care is shared by parents or is it just one), displacement of fledglings increases with the time. The weight of the egg is approximately 3.03 g and that of the fledglings 4.63 ± 0.25 g.

Vocalizations
The species has a variety of calls. The territorial tone is a high-sharp whistle, seeeeert sweeeert seeeet, constantly repeated every 1 to 3 seconds. Whistles can be heard at dusk or dawn. The flight whistle is usually heard during the breeding season as a high cheet. Females when flushed produce nasal sound like tchree-ee.

Distribution and habitat
The band-winged nightjar is a South American species that can be found at elevations of up to 4200 m. Its habitat ranges from the forest edge to semi-arid shrub lands, open areas and even on the roof of buildings. They are mainly nocturnal birds. They roost in a variety of environments from the forest floor to buildings. In Rio de Janeiro, band-winged nightjars have shown a behavioural plasticity, as they roost near sources of light in order to eat the insects that are attracted there.

Behaviour and ecology

Food
Band-winged nightjars feed on insects, mainly moths, beetles and termites.

Breeding
The breeding season varies by region. In western Venezuela, it is from February–September; For Ecuador, Colombia and Chile, is believed to be around late July, February to November and November, respectively; and for Argentina and SE Brazil (Río de Janeiro) from September to October. Band-winged nightjars do not construct a nest, instead the eggs are laid on a ground depression amongst dense vegetation, bare ground, or the side of roads. Usually, they lay 1-2 elliptical eggs each breeding season which vary in colour from creamy pink, whitish, spotted brown, lilac and grey.

Eggs are approximately 25 mm long by 20 mm wide, and weigh ~5 g. SystelluraThe asynchrony of the laid eggs can cause differences in the dimensions among eggs of the same clutch. In courtship, the male bends over to the ground, revealing the white spots on the rectices. The eggs hatch after a period of 17 days. Females invest intense periods of time during the day (~14 h), while males normally only spend 20% of their time with the clutch. Parents normally abandon the nest during dust or dawn; there is no evidence of parents moving eggs from the nest.

References

band-winged nightjar
band-winged nightjar
Birds of South America
band-winged nightjar
band-winged nightjar
Taxonomy articles created by Polbot